The Woodhaven Boulevard station is an elevated station on the BMT Jamaica Line of the New York City Subway, located in Woodhaven, Queens. It is served by the J train at all times and the Z train during rush hours in the peak direction. , the Queens-bound platform is temporarily closed.

History 
This station opened on May 28, 1917 under the Brooklyn Union Elevated Railroad, an affiliate of the Brooklyn Rapid Transit Company.

As part of the Metropolitan Transportation Authority's 2015–2019 Capital Program, the Woodhaven Boulevard station was selected to receive elevators as part of a process to expand the New York City Subway system's accessibility. , funding had been committed to accessibility renovations at the Woodhaven Boulevard station. In December 2021, the MTA awarded a contract for the installation of elevators at eight stations, including the Woodhaven Boulevard station. , the project is scheduled to be completed in May 2024. 

In February 2023, the Metropolitan Transportation Authority announced that this station would temporarily close for renovations as part of a station renewal contract at four stations on the Jamaica Line. Starting February 27, the Queens-bound platforms at this station and 75th Street-Elderts Lane will close. The closure will shift to the Manhattan-bound platforms in late summer. Work includes platform renewals, replacement of stairs, canopies, and windscreens, installation of artwork, and minimizing the gaps between the train and the platform edge. The work will be performed by Gramercy PJS Joint-Venture.

Station layout

This elevated station has two tracks and two side platforms with space for a center track. Both platforms have beige windscreens and brown canopies with green roofs along the entire length except for a section at the west (railroad south) end. Here, there are only waist-high black steel fences.

This station has provisions built in its structure to convert it into an express station, if the center third track was to be installed. The other station on the line that had such provisions was the now demolished Sutphin Boulevard station.

The 1990 artwork here is called Five Points of Observation by Kathleen McCarthy. It affords a view of the street from the platforms and resembles a face when seen from the street. This artwork is also located on four other BMT Jamaica Line stations.

Exits
This station has two entrances/exits, both of which are elevated station houses beneath the tracks that allow free transfers between directions. The main one is at the extreme west end and has a single staircase from each platform, turnstile bank, token booth, and two street stairs going down to either western corners of Woodhaven Boulevard and Jamaica Avenue.

The other station house is un-staffed, containing just two HEET turnstiles, a staircase to each platform, and one staircase going down to the southwest corner of 95th Street and Jamaica Avenue. The Queens-bound staircase's landing has an exit-only turnstile that allows passengers to exit the station without having to go through the station house.

References

External links 

 
 Station Reporter — J Train
 The Subway Nut — Woodhaven Boulevard Pictures
 MTA's Arts For Transit — Woodhaven Boulevard (BMT Jamaica Line)
 Woodhaven Boulevard entrance from Google Maps Street View
 95th Street entrance from Google Maps Street View
 Platforms from Google Maps Street View

BMT Jamaica Line stations
1917 establishments in New York City
New York City Subway stations in Queens, New York
Railway stations in the United States opened in 1917
Woodhaven, Queens